Ilan Bakhar (born May 17, 1975 in Ramat Gan) is a retired Israeli footballer who played as a right defender.

Football career
During his 14-year professional career, Bakhar played for seven different clubs in his country. He also had two unassuming stints abroad: with Racing de Santander in Spain, being part of the first pair of Israelis to sign with the Cantabrians, alongside Yossi Benayoun, and playing only twice during the season, and in Portugal with Sporting de Braga (no appearances).

Bakhar gained six caps for the national team, in a three-year span.

Honours
Israeli League: 1999–2000
Israeli Cup: 1999–2000
Toto Cup: 2001–02

External links
 One profile
 
 

1975 births
Living people
Israeli Jews
Israeli footballers
Association football defenders
Hapoel Ramat Gan F.C. players
Maccabi Herzliya F.C. players
Beitar Jerusalem F.C. players
Hapoel Tel Aviv F.C. players
Racing de Santander players
F.C. Ashdod players
S.C. Braga players
Hakoah Maccabi Amidar Ramat Gan F.C. players
Hapoel Nof HaGalil F.C. players
Hapoel Be'er Sheva F.C. players
Liga Leumit players
Israeli Premier League players
La Liga players
Israel international footballers
Israeli expatriate footballers
Expatriate footballers in Spain
Expatriate footballers in Portugal
Israeli expatriate sportspeople in Portugal
Israeli expatriate sportspeople in Spain
Footballers from Ramat Gan